The Ministry of Social Affairs, Justice and Interior of Andorra is responsible for social care and protection, employment and work. The ministry aims to guarantee the internal security of citizens and their assets, civil status, the regulation of migration and integration policy to guarantee social cohesion, the fight against crime, international collaboration in matters judicial and police, and protecting the population from any natural risk or catastrophe.

List of ministers

Minister of Justice and Home Affairs 
 Jordi Guitart Visent (2001-2005)

Minister of Justice and Interior 
 Josep Maria Cabanes (2005-2007)
 Antoni Riberaygua (2007-2009)

Minister of Interior 
 Víctor Naudi Zamora (2009-2011)

Minister of Justice and Interior 
 Marc Vila i Amigó (2011-2013)
 Xavier Espot Zamora (2014-2017)

Minister of Social Affairs, Justice and Interior 
 Xavier Espot Zamora (2017–present)

See also 
 Justice ministry
 Ministeri d'Afers Socials, Justícia i Interior d'Andorra [Ministry of Social Affairs, Justice and Interior of Andorra]
 Politics of Andorra

References 

Justice ministries
Government of Andorra